Rafael Nadal defeated Tomáš Berdych in the final, 6–3, 7–5, 6–4, to win the gentlemen's singles tennis title at the 2010 Wimbledon Championships. It was his second Wimbledon title and his eighth major title overall. It was also Nadal's fourth non-consecutive Wimbledon final (he skipped the 2009 tournament because of injuries).

Roger Federer was the defending champion, but lost in the quarterfinals to Berdych. This marked the first time since 2002 that Federer did not reach the final, and the second successive major where Federer was defeated at the quarterfinal stage, having previously been on a record run of 23 successive major semifinals. Federer's loss, along with those of Lleyton Hewitt and Andy Roddick, both in the fourth round, guaranteed a first-time Wimbledon finalist from the top half of the draw.

Berdych became the first Czech man to reach the final since Ivan Lendl in 1987. For the first time, there were no English players in the Wimbledon men's singles competition, though Great Britain was represented by two players from Scotland: fourth seed Andy Murray and wildcard Jamie Baker.

The first round match between John Isner and Nicolas Mahut set a new record for the longest tennis match in history (in both time and total of games), as well as many other records due to its length. Isner won the match, taking the final set 70–68 after a total of 11 hours and 5 minutes play across three days. Coincidentally, the two faced each other again in the first round the following year, with Isner taking that match 7–6(7–4), 6–2, 7–6(8–6).

Seeds

  Roger Federer (quarterfinals)
  Rafael Nadal (champion)
  Novak Djokovic (semifinals)
  Andy Murray (semifinals)
  Andy Roddick (fourth round)
  Robin Söderling (quarterfinals)
  Nikolay Davydenko (second round)
  Fernando Verdasco (first round)
  David Ferrer (fourth round)
  Jo-Wilfried Tsonga (quarterfinals)
  Marin Čilić (first round)
  Tomáš Berdych (final)
  Mikhail Youzhny (second round)
  Juan Carlos Ferrero (first round)
  Lleyton Hewitt (fourth round)
  Jürgen Melzer (fourth round)
  Ivan Ljubičić (first round)
  Sam Querrey (fourth round)
  Nicolás Almagro (first round)
  Stan Wawrinka (first round)
  Gaël Monfils (third round)
  Feliciano López (third round)
  John Isner (second round)
  Marcos Baghdatis (first round)
  Thomaz Bellucci (third round)
  Gilles Simon (third round)
  Ernests Gulbis (withdrew)
  Albert Montañés (third round)
  Philipp Kohlschreiber (third round)
  Tommy Robredo (first round)
  Victor Hănescu (third round, retired due to leg injury)
  Julien Benneteau (fourth round)
  Philipp Petzschner (third round)

Ernests Gulbis withdrew due to a muscle tear in his right thigh. He was replaced in the draw by the highest-ranked non-seeded player Philipp Petzschner, who became the #33 seed.

Qualifying

Draw

Finals

Top half

Section 1

Section 2

Section 3

Section 4

Bottom half

Section 5

Section 6

Section 7

Section 8

References

External links

 2010 Wimbledon Championships – Men's draws and results at the International Tennis Federation

Men's Singles
Wimbledon Championship by year – Men's singles